The Ridgeway executive council was the 13th executive council of British Ceylon. The government was led by Governor Joseph West Ridgeway.

Executive council members

See also
 Cabinet of Sri Lanka

References

1896 establishments in Ceylon
1903 disestablishments in Ceylon
Cabinets established in 1896
Cabinets disestablished in 1903
Ceylonese executive councils
Ministries of Queen Victoria
Ministries of Edward VII